Lariciresinol is a lignan, i.e., a type of phenylpropanoids.  It is the precursor to enterolignans by the action of gut microflora.  Enterolignans are of interest because they are speculated to exhibit beneficial medicinal properties.

Occurrence
In food, it is found in sesame seeds and in Brassica vegetables. It is also found in the bark and wood of white fir (Abies alba).

See also 
 List of phytochemicals in food

References 

Lignans
Tetrahydrofurans
Primary alcohols
Phenol ethers